The India national roller hockey team is the national team and represent India at international roller hockey. It is governed by the Roller Skating Federation of India (RSFI), it is full member of FIRS Roller Hockey B World Cup and Roller Hockey Asia Cup.

Medal table

Honours 
Roller Hockey Asia Cup

 – 1987, 2012, 2016

 – 1997, 2007, 2010, 2010

References

External links
Official website of Roller Skating Federation of India
Indian team on the Indian Roller Hockey Blog

National Roller Hockey Team
Roller hockey
National roller hockey (quad) teams